Malambo is a municipality and city in the Colombian department of Atlántico.

Malambo forms the southernmost part of the Metropolitan area of Barranquilla.

References

External links
 Gobernacion del Atlantico - Malambo
 Malambo official website

Municipalities of Atlántico Department